Annual Review of Physical Chemistry is a peer-reviewed scientific journal published by Annual Reviews. It covers all topics pertaining to physical chemistry. The editors are Mark A. Johnson (Yale University) and Todd J. Martínez (Stanford University). The journal is indexed in the Science Citation Index Expanded and Chemical Abstracts Service. As of 2022, Journal Citation Reports gives it a 2021 impact factor of 16.314.

History
The Annual Review of Physical Chemistry published its first volume in 1950. Its founding editor was University of California chemist Gerhard Krohn Rollefson. Some branches of physical chemistry were designated to be reviewed with each volume, while other branches would be reviewed less frequently. Upon Rollefson's death in 1955, he was succeeded by Henry Eyring. The editorial committee considered changing the name of the journal in the 1980s to the Annual Review of Physical Chemistry and Chemical Physics, though decided against it by 1988. In addition to publishing reviews about physical chemistry, many volumes contain a prefatory chapter with an informal review of a chemist or institution. As of 2020, it was published both in print and electronically.

It defines its scope as covering recent developments in the fields of biophysical chemistry, chemical kinetics, colloids, electrochemistry, geochemistry, cosmochemistry, atmospheric chemistry, laser chemistry and ultrafast processes, the liquid state, magnetic resonance, physical organic chemistry, polymers, and macromolecules. As of 2022, Journal Citation Reports gives it a 2021 impact factor of 16.314.

Editorial processes
The Annual Review of Physical Chemistry is helmed by the editor or co-editors. The editor is assisted by the editorial committee, which includes associate editors, regular members, and occasionally guest editors. Guest members participate at the invitation of the editor and serve terms of one year. All other members of the editorial committee are appointed by the Annual Reviews board of directors and serve five-year terms. The editorial committee determines which topics should be included in each volume and solicits reviews from qualified authors. Unsolicited manuscripts are not accepted. Peer review of accepted manuscripts is undertaken by the editorial committee.

Editors of volumes
Dates indicate publication years in which someone was credited as a lead editor or co-editor of a journal volume. The planning process for a volume begins well before the volume appears, so appointment to the position of lead editor generally occurred prior to the first year shown here. An editor who has retired or died may be credited as a lead editor of a volume that they helped to plan, even if it is published after their retirement or death.

 Gerhard Krohn Rollefson (1950–1955)
 Henry Eyring (1956–1976)
 Benton Seymour Rabinovitch (1977–1985)
 Herbert L. Strauss (1986–2001)
 Stephen Leone (2002–2011; retired 2011; credited 2012–2013)
 Mark A. Johnson and Todd Martínez (co-editors) (appointed 2012; credited 2014–present)

See also 
 List of chemistry journals

References 

 

Physical Chemistry
Physical chemistry journals
Publications established in 1950
English-language journals
Annual journals